Béla Fleck and the Flecktones is the first album by the band of the same name, released in 1990. It reached number 17 on the Billboard Top Contemporary Jazz Albums chart. At the Grammy Awards of 1997, a live version of "The Sinister Minister", a track from the album, won the Best Pop Instrumental Performance award.

Reception 

In his Allmusic review, music critic Brian Mansfield praised the album and wrote "For all the flash, there's little pretense; the group's astonishing musicianship keeps an 'aw-shucks' accessibility that lets everybody follow the melody while they marvel."

Track listing
All songs by Béla Fleck unless otherwise noted.
"Sea Brazil" – 3:43
"Frontiers" – 6:08
"Hurricane Camille" – 2:38
"Half Moon Bay" – 5:09
"The Sinister Minister" – 4:38
"Sunset Road" – 5:04
"Flipper" – 4:21
"Mars Needs Women: Space is a Lonely Place" – 5:01
"Mars Needs Women: They're Here" – 3:30
"Reflections of Lucy" (B. Fleck/John Lennon/Paul McCartney) – 3:38
"Tell It to the Gov'nor"  – 4:06

Single
The only single out of the album was "The Sinister Minister". The music video received heavy airplay on MTV and VH1 back in the early-90's. Because of the popularity of the video, it was featured on an episode of VH1's Pop-Up Video and won a Grammy in 1997, despite being a 1990 song.

Personnel
Béla Fleck – banjo
Howard Levy – diatonic harmonica (tracks 1, 2, 4, 5, 8-11), synth (tracks 5, 11), synthesizers (tracks 5, 6, 8, 10), piano (tracks 1-4, 6, 7, 10), Jew's harp (track 2), güiro (track 5)
Roy "Future Man" Wooten – Synth-Axe Drumitar
Victor Wooten – bass
Camille Harrison (uncredited) - vocals (track 6)

Production notes
Produced by Béla Fleck with the Flecktones
Carlos Grier – editing
Bil VornDick – mixing
Denny Purcell – mastering
Mark Fox – artwork, design
Laura LiPuma – art direction
Jim McGuire – photography

Chart positions

References

Béla Fleck and the Flecktones albums
1990 debut albums
Warner Records albums